Anthony Hugh Francis Harry St Clair-Erskine (18 May 1917 – 22 November 1977), styled Lord Loughborough from 1929 to 1939, was a British peer. The Earl's lands included the noted Rosslyn Chapel.

Early life
Lord Rosslyn was born in London on 18 May 1917 and was known as "Tony". He was the eldest son of the former Margaret Sheila Mackellar Chisholm (1898–1969) and Hon. Francis Edward Scudamore St Clair-Erskine, styled Lord Loughborough (1892–1929), who was known as "the man who broke the bank at Monte Carlo" His younger brother was Peter George Alex St Clair-Erskine, who served in the Royal Air Force until his death in 1939. His parents divorced in 1926 and his mother married Sir John Milbanke, 11th Baronet in 1928. They also divorced and she married Prince Dmitri Alexandrovich of Russia in 1954.

His maternal grandfather was Harry Chisholm of Sydney. His paternal grandparents were James St Clair-Erskine, 5th Earl of Rosslyn and the former Violet Aline Vyner (the second daughter and co-heiress of Robert Charles de Grey Vyner of Gautby Hall and Newby Hall). His grandparents divorced in 1902, and in 1903 his grandmother married the English race car driver Charles Jarrott (father of director Charles Jarrott). Through his half-aunt, Lady Mary, he was a cousin of Serena Mary Dunn, who married Jacob Rothschild, 4th Baron Rothschild; and Nell Mary Dunn, who married Jeremy Sandford and became a playwright and author.

Career
Upon his grandfather's death on 10 August 1939, as his father predeceased his grandfather, Anthony succeeded at the 6th Earl of Rosslyn. Lord Rosslyn was a friend of future American President John F. Kennedy, and wrote to him in 1940, stating:

"I read your book and I thought it very good indeed. It was beautifully written, though most American do not write beautifully."

In 1950, Lord Rosslyn added a stained glass memorial window in the baptistery Rosslyn Chapel, designed by William Wilson, dedicated to his late brother, a pilot who died in active service in 1939, and to his stepfather, Wg Cdr Sir John Milbanke, 11th Baronet, who died in 1947 from injuries also received during World War II. Later in the 1950s, he also led a programme of work to repair the roof and clean the interior carvings of the Chapel. In 1970, Lord Rosslyn added a second stained glass window, designed in a St Francis of Assisi theme by Carrick Whalen, and dedicated to his mother, Princess Dimitri of Russia who died in 1969.

Personal life
On 3 August 1955, Lord Rosslyn was married to Athenais de Rochechouart de Mortemart, the only daughter of Louis Victor de Mortemart, Duc de Vivonne, and Mme. Michael Valery Ollivier. Before their divorce in 1962, they were the parents of two children:

 Lady Caroline St Clair-Erskine (b. 1956), who married Michael Francis Marten, only son of Lt.-Col. Francis William Marten (eldest son of Vice-Admiral Sir Francis Arthur Marten) and Hon. Avice Irene Venables-Vernon (only daughter of Francis Venables-Vernon, 9th Baron Vernon), in 1991.
 Peter St Clair-Erskine, 7th Earl of Rosslyn (b. 1958), who married Helen Watters in 1982.

Lord Rosslyn died on 22 November 1977 at Midlothian and was buried at Rosslyn Chapel in Scotland.

Descendants
Through his son, he was posthumously a grandfather of James William St Clair-Erskine, Lord Loughborough (b. 1986), actress Lady Alice St Clair-Erskine (b. 1988), The Hon. Harry St Clair-Erskine, and Lady Lucia St Clair-Erskine.

References

External links
 Antony Hugh Francis Harry St Clair-Erskine, 6th Earl of Rosslyn (1917-1977), Son of Lord Loughborough at the National Portrait Gallery, London

1917 births
1977 deaths
Anthony
Earls in the Peerage of the United Kingdom